A list of films produced in Italy in 1952 (see 1952 in film):

A-F

G-N

O-Z

Documentaries and Shorts

References

External links
Italian films of 1952 at the Internet Movie Database

Italian
1952
Films